YY or variants may refer to:

 YY.com, a major Chinese social network
 yy (digraph), digraph used in various Latin alphabets
 Yy (musician), Canadian musician
 YY, the call sign prefix for radio stations in Venezuela
 Y. Y., pseudonym of Robert Wilson Lynd (1879–1949), Irish essayist
 Peptide YY 3-36, a peptide secreted by the gut in response to a meal, and reduces appetite
YY, the production code for the 1969 Doctor Who serial The Space Pirates

See also
 W (disambiguation)